Torah reading is a Jewish religious tradition that involves the public reading of a set of passages from a Torah scroll. The term often refers to the entire ceremony of removing the scroll (or scrolls) from the Torah ark, chanting the appropriate excerpt with special cantillation (trope), and returning the scroll(s) to the ark.
It is also commonly called "laining" (lein is also spelt lain, leyn, layn; from the Yiddish , which means "to read").

Regular public reading of the Torah was introduced by Ezra the Scribe after the return of the Judean exiles from the Babylonian captivity ( BCE), as described in the Book of Nehemiah. In the modern era, Orthodox Jews practice Torah reading according to a set procedure almost unchanged since the Talmudic era. Since the 19th century CE, Reform and Conservative Judaism have made adaptations to the practice of Torah reading, but the basic pattern of Torah reading has usually remained the same:

As a part of the morning or afternoon prayer services on certain days of the week or holidays, a section of the Pentateuch is read from a Torah scroll. On Shabbat (Saturday) mornings, a weekly section (known as a sedra or parashah) is read, selected so that the entire Pentateuch is read consecutively each year. On Sabbath afternoons, Mondays, and Thursdays, the beginning of the following Sabbath's portion is read. On Jewish holidays, Rosh Chodesh, and fast days, special sections connected to the day are read.

Many Jews observe an annual holiday, Simchat Torah, to celebrate the completion of the year's cycle of readings.

Origins and history of the practice

The introduction of public reading of the Torah by Ezra the Scribe after the return of the Judean exiles is described in Nehemiah Chapter 8.  However, the reading of the Torah three times a week (albeit not as many verses) goes back to the times of Moshe.

The mitzvah of Torah reading was based on the Biblical commandment of Hakhel (Deuteronomy 31:10–13), by which once every 7 years the entire people was to be gathered, "men, women and children," and hear much of Deuteronomy, the final volume of the Pentateuch, read to them (see the closing chapters of the Talmudic tractate Sotah) by the King.

Torah reading is discussed in the Mishna and Talmud, primarily in tractate Megilla.

It has been suggested that the reading of the Law was due to a desire to controvert the views of the Samaritans with regard to the various festivals, for which reason arrangements were made to have the passages of the Pentateuch relating to those festivals read and expounded on the feast-days themselves.

Triennial cycle

An alternative triennial cycle of Torah readings also existed at that time, a system whereby each week the portion read was approximately a third of the current. According to the Jewish Encyclopedia, the triennial cycle "was the practice in Palestine, whereas in Babylonia the entire Pentateuch was read in the synagogue in the course of a single year." As late as 1170 Benjamin of Tudela mentioned Egyptian congregations that took three years to read the Torah.

Joseph Jacobs, in the Jewish Encyclopedia article mentioned, notes that the transition from the triennial to the annual reading of the Law and the transference of the beginning of the cycle to the month of Tishri are attributed by Sándor Büchler to the influence of Abba Arika, also known as "Rab" or "Rav" (175–247 CE), a Jewish Talmudist who lived in Babylonia, and who established at Sura the systematic study of the rabbinic traditions, which, using the Mishnah as text, led to the compilation of the Talmud:

The current practice in Orthodox synagogues follows the annual/Babylonian cycle. At the time of the Jewish Encyclopedia's publication (1901–06), the author noted that there were only "slight traces of the triennial cycle in the four special Sabbaths and in some of the passages read upon the festivals, which are frequently sections of the triennial cycle, and not of the annual one".

In the 19th and 20th centuries, some Conservative (as evidenced in the Etz Hayim chumash) and most Reform, Reconstructionist and Renewal congregations have switched to a triennial cycle, where the first third of each parashah is read one year, the second third the next year and the final third in a third year. This must be distinguished from the ancient practice, which was to read each seder in serial order regardless of the week of the year, completing the entire Torah in three (or three and a half) years in a linear fashion.

Occasions when the Torah is read 
The beginning each weekly parashah (usually the first segment of seven) from the Torah is read during the morning services on Sabbath afternoons, Mondays and Thursdays. The entire weekly parashah is read on Saturdays mornings. Most major and minor festival and fast days have a unique Torah reading devoted to that day. The Torah is also read during afternoon services on fasts and Yom Kippur.

When the Torah is read in the morning, it comes after Tachanun or Hallel, or, if these are omitted, immediately after the Amidah. The Torah reading is followed by the recitation of the Half Kaddish.

When the Torah is read during the afternoon prayers, it occurs immediately before the Amidah.

Procedure 

The term "Torah reading" is often used to refer to the entire ceremony of taking the Torah scroll (or scrolls) out of its ark, reading excerpts from the Torah with a special tune, and putting the scroll(s) back in the Ark.

The Torah scroll is stored in an ornamental cabinet, called a holy ark, designed specifically for Torah scrolls. The Holy Ark is usually found in the front of the sanctuary, and is a central element of synagogue architecture. When needed for reading, the Torah is removed from the ark by someone chosen for the honor from among the congregants; specific prayers are recited as it is removed. The Torah is then carried by the one leading the services to the bimah — a platform or table from which it will be read; further prayers are recited by the congregation while this is done.

Ikuv keriah, rarely practiced today, was a procedure by which community members could have their grievances addressed by interfering with the service at the time the Torah was removed from the Ark.

Hagbaha

In the Sefardic tradition, the Torah is lifted before the reading, and this is called "Levantar," Spanish for "to lift up". In the Yemenite tradition, the Torah remains in a resting position while just the parchment is raised.

In Ashkenazic tradition, lifting is called "Hagbaha" and is now usually done after the reading. The order was a matter of medieval dispute but the position of the Kol Bo, lifting before, eventually lost to that of Moses Isserles and is followed in only a few Ashkenazic communities. Two honorees are called: the Magbiah ("lifter") performs Hagbaha ("lifting [of the Torah]") and displays the Torah's Hebrew text for all to see, after which the Golel ("roller") performs Gelila ("rolling" [of the Torah]") and puts on the cover, belt, crown, and/or other ornaments (this role, originally distinguished, is now often given to minors). In Conservative, Reform, Reconstructionist, and some Open Orthodox congregations, these roles may also be performed by a woman. The respective titles for women are "Magbihah" and "Golelet". Rashi says on Megillah 32a that these roles were originally performed by the same honoree.

As the Hagbaha is performed, the congregation points toward the Torah scroll with their pinky fingers and recites Deut. 4:44, "And this is the Law which Moses set before the people of Israel", adding, "on the word of the LORD, by hand of Moses." The custom of pointing has no clear origin. The medieval Ashkenazic custom (according to Moses Isserles) was to bow toward the scroll during Hagbaha; pointing with the pinky, first recorded as a "Russian" custom by the 1912 Jewish Encyclopedia, was codified by the Me'am Loez in 1969. Twentieth-century additions to the Me'am Loez were written by an Ashkenazi, Shmuel Kroizer, but the Sephardic prestige of the work has helped the custom become near-universal among both Sephardic and Ashkenazi Jews.

In Ashkenazic congregations, the Magbiah will usually sit holding the scroll until after the Haftarah is performed and the chazzan takes it from him to return it to the ark. In some congregations, the scroll is instead placed on the bimah or handed to a different honoree (frequently a minor) to sit and hold.

Aliyot

A synagogue official, called a gabbai, then calls up several people (men in most Orthodox and some Conservative congregations, men and women in others, and both men and women at Reform congregations) in turn, to be honored with an aliyah (pl.  aliyot; "ascent" or "going up"). The honoree, or oleh (plural olim), stands at the bima and recites a blessing, after which either the oleh or, more usually, a designated reader reads a section of the day's Torah portion, followed by another blessing recited by the oleh. 

There are always at least three aliyot in a given Torah-reading service:

On Saturday mornings, there are seven olim, the maximum of any day, but more may be added if desired, by subdividing these seven aliyot or repeating passages (according to the custom of some communities). When a festival or Yom Kippur coincides with Shabbat the readings are divided into seven aliyot instead of five or six.

In most congregations, the oleh does not himself read the Torah aloud. Rather, he stands near it while a practiced expert, called a ba'al keri'ah ("one in charge of reading"; sometimes ba'al kore), reads the Torah, with cantillation, for the congregation. In some congregations the oleh follows along with the expert, reading in a whisper. In Yemenite communities, the oleh reads the portion himself, while another person, usually a young boy, recites the targum after each verse.

In both Orthodox and Conservative congregations, it is common practice to give out an aliyah to a man (or woman, in Conservative congregations) who has just recovered from a serious illness, or returned from a long trip, or survived some other significant danger, in order to allow him (or her) to recite a special blessing, known as "benching gomel", although technically one can "bench gomel" even without receiving an Aliyah.

Aliyot are also given to a groom-to-be, or in egalitarian congregations, the bride-to-be and groom-to-be, together, in a pre-wedding ceremony known as an "aufruf".

In Jewish custom, baby boys are named in a special ceremony, known as a brit milah, but baby girls are often named during the Torah reading on Shabbat or a holiday, with the father (in non-egalitarian congregations) or both parents (in egalitarian congregations) being called up for an aliyah prior to the naming, and a special blessing for the baby.

The first Aliyah
According to Orthodox Judaism, the first oleh (person called to read) is a kohen  and the second a levi; the third oleh is Yisr'el, — Jews who are neither kohen  nor levi.  Regarding subsequent Aliyot (4-7 on the Sabbath), according to the Ashkenazic tradition, these must be given to Yisr'elim, whereas according to the Sephardic tradition, they can be given to anyone. (This assumes that such people are available; there are rules in place for what is done if they are not.) The first two aliyot are referred to as "Kohen " and "Levi," while the rest are known by their number (in Hebrew). This practice is also followed in some but not all Conservative synagogues. Reform and Reconstructionist Judaism have abolished special ritual roles for the descendants of the Biblical priestly and levitical castes.

Each oleh, after being called to the Torah, approaches it, recites a benediction, a portion is read, and the oleh concludes with another benediction. Then the next oleh is called.

The gabbai recites a Hebrew verse upon calling the first person to the Torah. After that, men are called with: "Ya'amod (Let him arise), [Hebrew Name] ben (son of) [Father's Hebrew name] [Ha-Kohen (the Kohen) / Ha-Levi (the Levite)] (the name of the Aliyah in Hebrew)." In synagogues where women may receive aliyot, women are called with "Ta'amod (Let her arise), [Hebrew Name] bat (daughter of) [Father's Hebrew name] [Ha-Kohen (the Kohen) / Ha-Levi (the Levite)] (the name of the Aliyah in Hebrew)."

These aliyot are followed by half-kaddish. When the Torah is read in the afternoon, kaddish is not recited at this point, but rather after the Torah has been returned to the Ark.

The benedictions of the Aliyah
The oleh hastens from his seat to the desk, going directly to the desk without any interruptions. Although around the world, including North America, many congregations will have a trained scroll reader for the actual recitation, the very considerable honor of the reading is attributed to the oleh. If there was a previous portion read, the previous oleh then steps aside from the desk. The oleh takes his place at the desk facing the open scroll, the verse where his portion begins is pointed out for him, he may kiss the scroll (usually by kissing the corner of his prayer shawl or the Torah wrapping and then touching that to the margin – not the writing – of the scroll), and then he may close his eyes, or avert his face, or otherwise indicate that the blessing he is about to recite is not being read from the text of the Torah. While reciting the blessings he holds both handles of the scroll, and if the actual scroll reading is done by someone else, the oleh steps to the side but continues to hold with one hand one of the scroll's handles.

The preliminary blessing
The oleh says, preferably in a confident voice (as this is a call for a congregational response):

בָּרְכוּ אֶת יְיָ הַמְבֹרָךְ׃ 
Bar'chu es Adonai ham'vorach. 
You will bless The Lord the Blessed one.°     (°   or "who is to be blessed ")

The congregation responds with the traditional blessing:
בָּרוּךְ יְיָ הַמְבֹרָךְ לְעוֹלָם וָעֶד׃ 
Baruch Adonai ham'vorach l'olam va'ed.
Bless The Lord who is (to be) blessed forever and eternally.

The oleh now repeats the blessing just uttered by the congregation.

The oleh will then say: 
בָּרוּךְ אַתָּה יְיָ אֱלֹהֵינוּ מֶלֶךְ הָעוֹלָם׃ 
אֲשֶׁר בָּחַר בָּנוּ מִכָּל הָעַמִּים וְנָתַן לָנוּ אֶת תּוֹרָתוֹ׃ 
בָּרוּךְ אַתָּה יְיָ נוֹתֵן הַתּוֹרָה׃ 
Baruch atah Adonai, Eloheynu melech ha'olam. 
Asher bachar banu mikol ha'amim v'nosan lanu es toraso. 
Baruch atah Adonai, nosayn hatorah.
Blessed are You, O Lord our God, king of all existence,
Who chose us from among all nations and who gave us your Torah. 
Blessed are You, O Lord, who gives the Torah.
 [Congregation: ]   Amen.

The concluding benediction
The portion of the Torah is then read. If a more skilled person is doing the recitation, the oleh will follow the reading (using the scroll or a printed book) in a subdued voice, as will the members of the congregation. When the portion is finished, the oleh then says the concluding benediction:

בָּרוּךְ אַתָּה יְיָ אֱלֹהֵינוּ מֶלֶךְ הָעוֹלָם׃ 
אֲשֶׁר נָתַן לָנוּ תּוֹרַת אֶמֶת׃ 
וְחַיֵי עוֹלָם נָטַע בְּתוֹכֵנוּ׃ 
בָּרוּךְ אַתָּה יְיָ נוֹתֵן הַתּוֹרָה׃ 
Baruch atah Adonai, Eloheynu melech ha'olam.
Asher nosan lanu Toras emes.
Ve'chayay olam nota besohaynu. 
Baruch atah Adonai, nosayn ha-torah.
Blessed are You, O Lord our God, king of all existence,
Who has given us the Torah of the truth,
and life everlasting within us.
Blessed are You, O Lord, who gives the Torah.
 [Congregation: ]   Amen.
At this point, if the oleh has recently been in danger of death (such as serious sickness or surgery or an airplane flight or captivity), he will add the Birkhat HaGomel – a blessing of thanks to God "who has dealt kindly with me". The officiant may add a benediction for the oleh's good health, and there are some other blessings that may be added depending on the situation. The oleh will kiss the scroll again, and may shake hands with the oleh of the previous portion, who now returns to his seat, and if there is another portion to be read, the oleh steps aside for the next oleh, stands beside the desk while the next oleh reads his portion, shakes his hand and offers felicitation, thanks the officiant and the actual scroll reader for the honor he has received, and then returns to his seat – but slowly, as if reluctant to leave the scroll, and probably will pause on the way to accept the felicitations of various members of the congregation.

In North America, and elsewhere, many congregations extend the honor of an aliyah to visitors or new members, to members who have recently attained a major life event, and to the relatives of the bar mitzvah boy. Refusing an aliyah is regarded as an insult to the Torah itself. It would be desirable that anyone who might expect such an honor would rehearse these blessings beforehand in order to do a creditable performance when the occasion occurs.

Gelila
After the reading, if the Torah is not in a wooden case, the Golel ("roller") performs Gelila ("rolling up"), then binds the Torah with a sash and replaces the Torah's cover. This honor is sometimes given to a child under Bar Mitzvah age.

Maftir
On days when a haftarah is read (see Haftarah below), there is a final aliyah after the kaddish, called maftir. The person called to that aliyah, as well, is known as "the maftir." On holidays, maftir is read from the Torah verses describing the sacrifices brought in the Temple in Jerusalem on that particular holiday. In progressive synagogues alternative readings are read. On Saturday, the maftir is a repetition of the last few verses of the parsha.

When the Torah is read on the afternoon of a fast day (and on Yom Kippur), the third aliyah is considered the maftir, and is followed immediately by the haftarah.

Haftarah

On Saturday and holiday mornings, as well as on Tisha B'av in the morning (in many communities), the afternoons of fast days (in many communities) and Yom Kippur, the Torah reading concludes with the haftarah – a reading from one of the Books of Prophets. The haftarah usually relates in some way to either the Torah reading of that day, a theme of the holiday, or the time of year.

Returning the Torah
The Torah scroll is then put back in its ark to the accompaniment of specific prayers.

The Chazzan takes the Torah scroll in his right arm and recites "Let them praise the name of HaShem, for his name alone will have been exalted." The congregation then responds with Psalm 148, verses 13–14.

What is read

The cycle of weekly readings is fixed. Because the Hebrew calendar varies from year to year, two readings are sometimes combined so that the entire Pentateuch is read over the course of a year.

Weekly portion 

On Shabbat mornings, the weekly Torah portion (parashah) is read. It is divided into seven or more aliyot (see above for more on aliyot).

Daily portion 
On Monday and Thursday mornings (except if there is another special reading) and on Saturday afternoons, a small section of the upcoming week's parashah is read, divided into three aliyot

Jewish holidays
On Jewish holidays, the reading relates to the day. For example, on Passover the congregation reads various sections of the Pentateuch that relate to that holiday.

Order of precedence for special readings 
When multiple special occasions occur at the same time, there is a standard order of precedence. Generally speaking, when major Jewish holidays occur on Shabbat the holiday portion is read, although divided into the seven portions for Shabbat rather than the number appropriate for the holiday — there is a special reading for when Shabbat coincides with the Chol HaMoed (intermediate days) of Passover or Sukkot. However, when Shabbat coincides with minor holidays, such as Rosh Chodesh (New month) or Hanukkah, the regular reading for Shabbat is read, plus an additional reading (maftir) relevant to the occasion. The additional reading is read from a second scroll if available. On rare occasions, such as when a Rosh Chodesh falls on a Shabbat that also commemorates another occasion, such as Hanukkah or when one of the four special additional readings read prior to Passover, there are two additional readings and three scrolls (if available) are read.

Simchat Torah 

On Simchat Torah, the order of weekly readings is completed, and the day is celebrated with various customs involving the Torah. In many communities, the Torah is read at night – a unique occurrence, preceded by seven rounds of song and dance (hakafot, sing. hakafah; some communities have hakafot without subsequently reading the Torah.) During the hakafot, most or all of the synagogue's Torah scrolls are removed from the Holy Ark, and carried around the Bimah by members of the congregation.

On the day of Simchat Torah (in Judaism, day follows night), some communities repeat the seven rounds of song and dance to varying degrees, while in others the Torah scrolls are only carried around the Bimah (seven times) symbolically. Afterwards, many communities have the custom of calling every member of the congregation for an aliyah, which is accomplished by repeatedly re-reading the day's five aliyot. The process is often expedited by splitting the congregants into multiple rooms, to each of which a Torah is brought for the reading.

Following the regular aliyot, the honor of Hatan Torah ("Groom of the Torah") is given to a distinguished member of the congregation, who is called for an aliyah in which the remaining verses of the Torah are read, to complete that year's reading. Another member of the congregation is honored with Hatan Bereishit ("Groom of Genesis"), and receives an aliyah in which the first verses of the Torah, containing the creation account of Genesis, are read (a second copy of the Torah is usually used, so that the first need not be rolled all the way to the beginning while the congregants wait). Afterwards, the services proceed in the usual manner, with the maftir and haftarah for Simchat Torah.

Women and Torah reading

Orthodox congregations 
The Talmud states that "anyone can be called up to read from the Torah, even a minor and even a woman, but our sages taught that we do not call a woman on account of Kevod Hatzibur" (the dignity of the congregation; Megillah 23a). This statement is mirrored in the Shulchan Aruch, Orach Hayim 282:3.

Based on this in most Orthodox congregations, only men are called to the Torah. This term is interpreted in numerous ways by various sources.

It would slight the community because it would appear to others that the men in the community were not well educated enough to read from the Torah because it was assumed that a community would not have a woman read from the Torah if there were men who could do so. 
It imposes unnecessary bother on the congregation, or that disturbs the seriousness and propriety of the synagogue service.
A women is not a worthy representative of the community.
It is a social construct and in the time of the Talmud and Shulchan Aruch women were not significant members of society.

Modern Orthodox congregations 
Mendel Shapiro and Daniel Sperber permit women to participate in regular Torah reading on Shabbat, in services known as "partnership minyanim". This innovation is not accepted in Orthodox communities, including almost all Modern Orthodox communities. Prominent Modern Orthodox posqim, including Hershel Schachter, Mordechai Willig, Nisson Alpert, and others have ruled that this practice is not permitted.  

A small number of Modern Orthodox congregations have added all-female prayer groups, where women are permitted to read the Torah to an audience of women, though generally without blessings, aliyot, or associated liturgy. The Chief Rabbi of the Commonwealth, Rabbi Ephraim Mirvis stated that women were not permitted to read from the Torah in the United Synagogues.

Conservative, Reform, Reconstructionist, and Renewal 
Most but not all Conservative congregations permit women to have an aliyah for at least part of the reading. Many Conservative congregations, and nearly all Reform, Reconstructionist, and Renewal congregations, practice complete gender egalitarianism.

Conservative Judaism
Conservative Judaism generally follows practices for Torah reading similar to Orthodox Judaism except that:
 In most but not all Conservative synagogues, women can receive an aliyah and can chant from the Torah out loud ("leyn"). This has been an option for Conservative synagogues since 1955.
In some Conservative synagogues, women who are B'not Kohen (daughter of a Kohen) or B'not Levi (daughter of a Levite) can be called for the first or second aliyot. In Israel and some congregations in North America, only men are permitted to be called for the Kohen and Levite aliyot even if women can be called for the other aliyot.
Some Conservative synagogues do not call a Kohen or a Levite first at all, although Conservative Judaism as a whole retains some elements of special tribal roles.
Some Conservative congregations use a triennial cycle, reading approximately a third of the Torah every year and completing the reading in three years.

Reform, Reconstructionist, and Renewal Judaism 
In addition to changes mentioned above for Conservative Judaism, these movements generally practice:

 complete gender egalitarianism;
 abolition of tribal distinctions among kohen, levi, and yisrael on grounds of egalitarianism. In some cases (such as Bar or Bat Mitzvah ceremonies) only one person will read the text;
 aliyot may be given out as a means of honoring members for their contributions to the congregation instead of on the basis of the ancient castes.
 abridgement of the portion read (sometimes by instituting a triennial cycle) and reducing of the number of aliyot (most congregations);
 some congregations may modify the order of the portions read;
 main Shabbat service on Friday night with Torah reading (some Reform congregations);
 some synagogues will give the option for the reader either to chant or simply read aloud the text;

See also
Aliyah (Torah)
Weekly Torah portion
Hebrew cantillation
Haftarah
Minyan
Sefer Torah
Torah ark
Yom Tov Torah readings
Torah study
Yad

Other religions
Qur'an reading, in Islam
Lesson, in Christianity
Bible study, private or small group reading predominantly in Protestant Christianity

References

Further reading
 Gidon Rothstein, "Women’s Aliyyot in Contemporary Synagogues." Tradition 39(2), Summer 2005.
 Joel B. Wolowelsky, "On Kohanim and Uncommon Aliyyot." Tradition 39(2), Summer 2005.
 Aryeh A. Frimer and Dov I. Frimer, "Women, Kri'at haTorah and Aliyyot (with an Addendum on Partnership Minyanim)", Tradition, 46:4 (Winter 2013), 67–238, Hebrew translation.

External links
Hyperlinked table of Torah readings
Summary of Reading by Weekly Parasha 
Akhlah: Torah readings for children
Torah´s Studies
Text, transliteration and recording of Torah blessings

 
Mincha
Shabbat
Shacharit
Torah